Devin or Devon Williams may refer to:

 Devin Williams (baseball), American professional baseball player 
 Devin Williams (basketball), American professional basketball player 
 Devon Williams (decathlete), American decathlete 
 Devon Williams (footballer), Jamaican footballer
 Devon Williams (rugby union), South African rugby union player
 Devon Williams, a guitarist and vocalist for bands Lavender Diamond, Osker and Fingers Cut Megamachine